Goodwin Hon Liu (born October 19, 1970; Chinese: 劉弘威) is an American lawyer, educator and an associate justice of the Supreme Court of California. Before his appointment by California Governor Jerry Brown, Liu was Associate Dean and Professor of Law at the University of California, Berkeley School of Law (Boalt Hall). Liu has been recognized for his writing on constitutional law, education policy, civil rights, and the Supreme Court.

Born in Georgia, US, Liu attended Stanford University, the University of Oxford, and Yale Law School. On February 24, 2010, President Barack Obama nominated Liu to fill a vacancy on the U.S. Court of Appeals for the Ninth Circuit. For more than a year, Liu's nomination languished, amid significant opposition from Republicans in the U.S. Senate. On May 19, 2011, the Senate failed to invoke cloture on Liu's nomination with the necessary supermajority in a 52–43 vote, and on May 25, 2011, Liu informed President Obama that he was withdrawing his name from consideration to the seat on the Ninth Circuit, telling the president that "With no possibility of an up-or-down vote on the horizon, my family and I have decided that it is time for us to regain the ability to make plans for the future."

On July 26, 2011, Governor Jerry Brown nominated Liu to a seat on the Supreme Court of California, succeeding Associate Justice Carlos R. Moreno. Three days later, President Obama formally notified the Senate that he was withdrawing Liu's nomination for the federal Ninth Circuit Court of Appeals. Liu was sworn into the California Supreme Court on September 1, 2011.

Early life and education
Liu was born in Augusta, Georgia, of Taiwanese descent, the second son of Wen-Pen Liu(劉文彬) and Yang-Ching Cai(蔡洋清), both of whom came to the United States from Taiwan in the late 1960s, when foreign doctors were being recruited to work in underserved areas. Liu and his family moved to Clewiston, Florida, shortly after his birth and then in 1977, they relocated to Sacramento, California, where Liu graduated from Rio Americano High School. He earned a Bachelor of Science in biology at Stanford University. While there he was active in student politics as a member of the People's Platform, serving on the Council of Presidents of the ASSU. He attended Lady Margaret Hall, Oxford on a Rhodes Scholarship and earned a Master of Philosophy in philosophy and physiology. Liu received his  Juris Doctor from Yale Law School.

Career

Liu initially worked as an appellate litigator at O'Melveny & Myers in Washington. He later clerked for Judge David S. Tatel of the U.S. Court of Appeals for the D.C. Circuit and then for Justice Ruth Bader Ginsburg of the U.S. Supreme Court, where among other things, he contributed a draft to her dissent in Bush v. Gore. He also served as special assistant to the deputy secretary of the U.S. Department of Education and as senior program officer for higher education at the Corporation for National Service (AmeriCorps). He is also a former chair of the board of directors of the American Constitution Society.

He was a professor at University of California, Berkeley. He was elected to the American Law Institute in May 2008 and was elected to the ALI Council in May 2013. He currently serves as the chair of the ALI's committee on the Young Scholars Medal. He serves on the boards of the National Women's Law Center and the Alliance for Excellent Education.

Professorship
He took a job at the University of California, Berkeley School of Law, where he became Associate Dean and Professor of Law. In 2009 Liu was awarded the UC Berkeley Distinguished Teaching Award.

Nomination to the Ninth Circuit

On February 24, 2010, President Obama nominated Liu to a new judgeship seat on the Ninth Circuit created by the Court Security Improvement Act of 2007; which became effective on January 21, 2009. His nomination was filibustered by Republicans in the Senate and expired with the sine die adjournment of the 111th Congress. He was renominated to the same position on the first full day of the 112th Congress. On April 7, 2011 the Senate Judiciary Committee reported his nomination to the floor of the Senate by a party-line 10–8 vote.

However, Liu's nomination was harshly criticized by Senate Republicans for allegedly failing to disclose 117 of his more controversial writings and speeches. On April 6, 2010, Liu submitted the 117 requested items to the committee as a supplemental to the original questionnaire. The committee hearing had been postponed twice particularly due to Republican opposition to Liu's judicial qualifications and record. Liu defended his writings as a scholar by saying that "there's a clear difference between what things people write as scholars and how one would approach the role of a judge". On April 6, 2010, a letter was sent to the Senate Judiciary Committee Chairman Patrick Leahy by the seven committee Republicans to request a third postponement, which was subsequently rejected. Liu was also criticized for lack of trial-level experience. Prior to his nomination, Liu had not served as a judge and had argued only one case at the appellate court level as a lawyer.

Liu's criticism of Chief Justice John Roberts and especially his statement during Samuel Alito's Supreme Court nomination "Judge Alito's record envisions an America where police may shoot and kill an unarmed boy to stop him from running away with a stolen purse; where federal agents may point guns at ordinary citizens during a raid, even after no sign of resistance, where a black man may be sentenced to death by an all-white jury for killing a white man, absent [an] analysis showing discrimination, is not the America we know. Nor is it the America we aspire to be" was targeted by Senate Republicans as proof of his lack of judicial temperament and partisanship. Liu later apologized and said that his words were "unduly harsh".

On May 17, 2011, Senator Harry Reid filed a cloture motion on Liu's nomination. On May 19, 2011, the Senate rejected cloture in a mostly party-line vote of 52–43, with all but one Democrat (Ben Nelson) voting in favor of cloture and all but one Republican (Lisa Murkowski) voting against. He became the first Obama judicial nominee to be successfully filibustered in the Senate. With the makeup of the Senate unlikely to change until after the 2012 election, Liu withdrew his name from consideration on May 25, 2011. On July 29, 2011, three days after California Governor Jerry Brown nominated Liu to a seat on the Supreme Court of California, President Obama formally notified the Senate that he was withdrawing Liu's nomination for the 9th Circuit. In a talk before The City Club of Cleveland on February 22, 2013, Liu commented that the confirmation process is "inherently a political process" and "the Constitution was designed to make it a political process." He noted, however, that the problem with the confirmation process is that it has become transformed into requiring 60 votes as opposed to a bare majority, which was not part of the Constitutional design.

California Supreme Court 

On July 26, 2011, California Gov. Jerry Brown nominated Liu to a seat on the Supreme Court of California. In submitting his nomination, Brown said that "[Liu] is a nationally recognized expert on constitutional law and has experience in private practice, [in] government service and in the academic community. I know that he will be an outstanding addition to our state supreme court." Liu responded to his nomination with a prepared statement: "I'm deeply honored by Governor Brown's nomination and look forward to the opportunity to serve the people of California on our state's highest court."

On August 30, the state bar commission that screens all nominees gave Liu a "unanimously well qualified" rating, describing him as "brilliant, impartial, and with a work ethic second to none ... [h]e has an unwavering commitment to equal access to justice and will treat all litigants fairly, without regard to wealth or position in society." He was confirmed unanimously the next day by Chief Justice Tani Cantil-Sakauye, state Attorney General Kamala Harris, and Presiding Justice Joan Dempsey-Klein, the senior-most presiding justice serving on the California Court of Appeal. Ten witnesses testified in favor of his nomination and none testified against.

Liu was sworn in on September 1, 2011, and took the bench on September 6, sitting on a procedural issue regarding the controversial Perry v. Schwarzenegger case.

While the other justices employ five permanent staff as law clerks, Justice Liu has returned to the traditional use of recent law school graduates as one-year clerks.

, following the 2022 election, he was retained by California voters to continue to serve as an associate justice with 69.2% of an affirmative vote.

Opinions
In his first year on the bench, Liu authored six decisions, all of them unanimous.

Kirby v. Immoos Fire Protection, Inc.
Dicon Fiberoptics, Inc. v. Franchise Tax Board
United Teachers of Los Angeles v. Los Angeles Unified School Dist.
Coito v. Superior Court
National Paint & Coatings Assn., Inc. v. South Coast Air Quality Management Dist.
Parks v. MBNA American Bank

He also authored the majority opinion in Apple v. Superior Court, where he ruled that online retailers can continue asking for credit card holder's information, such as telephone numbers and home addresses, when completing a transaction with a credit card. The complaint arose from the Song-Beverly Credit Card Act of 1971, which sought to protect consumer privacy when purchasing products in a store. Liu instead ruled for Apple, concluding that "because we cannot make a square peg fit a round hole, we must conclude that online transactions involving electronically downloadable products fall outside the coverage of the statute."

In 2015, Justice Liu joined in the California Supreme Court's unauthored opinion, In re Hong Yen Chang, which posthumously admitted Chang to the State Bar. Chang was denied admission to the bar by the court in 1890, due to the federal Chinese Exclusion Act. Justice Liu and the rest of the California Supreme Court abrogated the court's previous decision and held that "the discriminatory exclusion of Chang from the State Bar of California was a grievous wrong" that "denied Chang equal protection of the laws".

Positions
Liu is socially liberal. He has written in favor of affirmative action, abortion rights, and same-sex marriage and has been critical of Bush-era waterboarding policy and the death penalty. In a 2008 article for the Stanford Law Review, Liu advocated a constitutional right to receive welfare.  His positions are predominantly left-leaning; however, Liu has supported charter schools and government-funded vouchers for private schools, particularly if used as a tool to "promote racial diversity." Justice Liu has defended the California Supreme Court's practice of drafting its opinions before hearing oral arguments.

Gerald Uelman, a professor and former dean of the University of Santa Clara School of Law, was impressed with Liu's work, saying "He displays a very independent streak. His opinions are very well thought out and well reasoned." Bob Egelko, a legal affairs reporter for the San Francisco Chronicle, agreed, saying that "his dissents come within the ideological boundaries of [the California Supreme Court], which is an institution that in general moves incrementally."

Publications
Liu's recent work includes "Keeping Faith with the Constitution" (2009) (with Pamela S. Karlan and Christopher H. Schroeder); "Rethinking Constitutional Welfare Rights" in Stanford Law Review (2008); "History Will Be Heard: An Appraisal of the Seattle/Louisville Decision" in Harvard Law & Policy Review (2008); "Improving Title I Funding Equity Across States, Districts, and Schools," in Iowa Law Review (2008); "Seattle and Louisville" in California Law Review (2007); "Education, Equality, and National Citizenship" in Yale Law Journal (2006); and "Interstate Inequality in Educational Opportunity" in New York University Law Review (2006).

Awards and memberships
In 2007, Liu's work won the Education Law Association's Steven S. Goldberg Award for Distinguished Scholarship in Education Law. In 2009, Liu won the UC Berkeley Distinguished Teaching Award. In 2020 he was elected to the American Philosophical Society.

Personal life
Liu was married to Ann M. O'Leary, who was a senior policy adviser to the Hillary Clinton's 2016 presidential campaign. Liu and O'Leary had two children before announcing their separation in 2016. Liu is in a relationship with former San Francisco Supervisor Jane Kim, who was once his law student. Liu is a skilled chef and fisherman. Liu's father, Wenpen Liu, a medical doctor, is active in Taiwanese politics and Taiwan independence movement, and is a main organizer in the Democratic Progressive Party overseas and head of the Sacramento office of the Formosan Association for Public Affairs.

See also 

 Barack Obama judicial appointment controversies
 Barack Obama Supreme Court candidates
 Joe Biden Supreme Court candidates
 List of Asian American jurists
 List of justices of the Supreme Court of California
 List of law clerks of the Supreme Court of the United States (Seat 6)

References

Videos

External links

 Associate Justice Goodwin Liu – California Courts
 Goodwin Liu, Judgepedia
 Associate Justice Goodwin Liu  on Berkeley Law website
 Past & Present Justices. California State Courts.

|-

1970 births
Living people
American academics of Taiwanese descent
American jurists of Taiwanese descent
American Rhodes Scholars
Justices of the Supreme Court of California
Jurisprudence academics
Law clerks of the Supreme Court of the United States
Lawyers from Sacramento, California
People from Augusta, Georgia
People from Clewiston, Florida
Politicians from Sacramento, California
Stanford University alumni
Stanford University trustees
UC Berkeley School of Law faculty
University of California, Berkeley administrators
Yale Law School alumni
Alumni of Lady Margaret Hall, Oxford
21st-century American judges
20th-century American lawyers
Members of the American Law Institute
Members of the American Philosophical Society